The Aesthedes was a computer graphics or computer-aided design (CAD) system designed and developed in the 1970s and 1980s by Claessens Product Consultants (now Cartils) in Hilversum, Netherlands.

The Aesthedes was introduced to the market in 1984 by D.P.G. Claessens (1922–2019) who, after studying monumental art at the State Academy of Art in Amsterdam, studied Industrial Design.

He started a Product Development company in 1960, Claessens Product Consultants (now Cartils) in Hilversum, with clients such as Heineken, Amstel, Bijenkorf, Philips, Douwe Egberts, Friese Vlag, Bols, etc. In the mid-1960s he started experimenting with electronic equipment to support his design work.

A growing need within his company for such equipment that did not exist before led to the development of the Aesthedes. The vision of Dominique Claessens was that a designer should be able to start immediately, without knowledge of computers. Meeting the need of designers to be able to use their creative brain, without being hindered by switching to the cognitive part of their brain, a keyboard was developed that matched the layout of the creative designer's desk. Everything had to be within reach and no overlapping of windows, for example. For that reason, the Aesthedes has 6 screens. 3 Data screens (below) showing project data, RGB values of the layer and the last 10 commands executed.

The computer was launched commercially in 1985 from Aesthedes offices in Hilversum, London, Cologne and Los Angeles. The first version was equipped with ten Motorola 68000 microprocessors, three 20” full colour, high-resolution screens and three small data display screens. It was unique at the time for being able to manipulate B-splines (a type of curve) in real time and to produce camera ready (i.e. ultra-high resolution) finished artwork for use in offset printing or other printing processes, including photogravure.

The 3 screens above are from left to right the "Zoom screen" on which a drawing can be zoomed up to 100x, the "Creation" screen in the middle where the total image of all layers is on top of each other and the right screen on which the current working layer can be seen and on which any animations can be seen.

The 3 color monitors show 16 million colors at a resolution of 512 x 512. There are 64 layers available on which you can work with a canvas of 64000 x 64000 pixels.

One of the earliest customers in the Netherlands for an Aesthedes CAD system was the state printer, SDU, which uses the machine to design various hard-to-forge works, including parts of the Dutch 25-guilder note Jaap Drupsteen (the "robin").  Aesthedes was also used extensively in the design of Heineken and Amstel beer bottle labels. Its launch customer in the UK was Marks & Spencer, which used it to design signage and food packaging. The supermarket Asda and design agencies such as Michael Peters & Partners and Holmes & Marchant were among other early customers. The Apple Macintosh revolutionized the graphic design world and rendered the Aesthedes effectively obsolete. The company was sold by Claessens to Barco.

Gallery

References

External links
 Aesthedes 2 graphic designer's work station.
 Google Plus page showing pictures of the Aesthedes  workstation.
 Aesthedes 2 at the HomeComputerMuseum.

Computer workstations
Film and video technology
Computer-related introductions in 1982
Information technology companies of Belgium
Graphics hardware companies
1982 establishments in the Netherlands
Companies based in Amsterdam
Multinational companies headquartered in the Netherlands
Dutch brands